Gattyana fauveli is a scale worm described from the Bay of Bengal in the Indian Ocean in intertidal and shallow water.

Biology and Ecology
Gattyana fauveli has a commensal relationship with the echiuran, Anelassorhynchus branchiorhynchus.

References

Phyllodocida